Coccidiphila silvatica is a moth in the family Cosmopterigidae. It was described by Edward Meyrick in 1917. It is found in Kumaon division, India. The larvae have been recorded feeding on Pinus roxburghii and mealybugs.

The forewings are white, irrorated (sprinkled) with dark fuscous, appearing grey.

References

Moths described in 1917
Cosmopteriginae